Giovanni Pietro Gnocchi was an Italian painter, active during the late 16th century in Lombardy in a late-Renaissance or  Mannerist styles.

Biography
He was born in Milan, and a pupil of Aurelio Luini.
His altarpiece depicting the Madonna and child with Saints Margherita d'Antiochia, Sant'Ambrogio (?), San Domenico, Santa Liberata e Santa Faustina is in the Museo Civici of Como. He was active in Como in 1577–1579.

References

Mannerist painters
Painters from Milan
16th-century Italian painters
Italian male painters
Year of birth unknown
Year of death unknown